The 18th G7 Summit was held in Munich, Germany between 6 and 8 July 1992. The venue for the summit meetings was at the Residenz palace in central Munich.
 
The Group of Seven (G7) was an unofficial forum which brought together the heads of the richest industrialized countries: France, Germany, Italy, Japan, the United Kingdom, the United States, Canada (since 1976), and the President of the European Commission (starting officially in 1981). The summits were not meant to be linked formally with wider international institutions; and in fact, a mild rebellion against the stiff formality of other international meetings was a part of the genesis of cooperation between France's president Valéry Giscard d'Estaing and West Germany's chancellor Helmut Schmidt as they conceived the first Group of Six (G6) summit in 1975.

Leaders at the summit

The G7 is an unofficial annual forum for the leaders of Canada, the European Commission, France, Germany, Italy, Japan, the United Kingdom, and the United States.

The 18th G7 summit was the first summit for Italian Prime Minister Giuliano Amato and Japanese Prime Minister Kiichi Miyazawa. It was also the last summit for Canadian Prime Minister Brian Mulroney and US President George H. W. Bush.

Participants
These summit participants are the current "core members" of the international forum:

Issues
The summit was intended as a venue for resolving differences among its members. As a practical matter, the summit was also conceived as an opportunity for its members to give each other mutual encouragement in the face of difficult economic decisions. Issues which were discussed at this summit included:
 World Economy 
 United Nations Conference on Environment and Development(UNCED) 
 Developing Countries 
 Central and Eastern Europe 
 New Independent States of the Former Soviet Union 
 Safety of Nuclear Power Plants in the New Independent States of the Former Soviet Union and in Central and Eastern Europe

Gallery

See also
 G8

Notes

References
 Bayne, Nicholas and Robert D. Putnam. (2000).  Hanging in There: The G7 and G8 Summit in Maturity and Renewal. Aldershot, Hampshire, England: Ashgate Publishing. ; OCLC 43186692(  2009-04-29)
 Reinalda, Bob and Bertjan Verbeek. (1998).  Autonomous Policy Making by International Organizations. London: Routledge.  ; ;

External links
 No official website is created for any G7 summit prior to 1995 -- see the 21st G7 summit.
 University of Toronto: G8 Research Group, G8 Information Centre
  G7 1992, delegations & documents

1990s in Munich
G7 summit
G7 summit
1992 in international relations
G7 summit 1992
G7 summit 1992
G7 summit 1992
1992
G7 summit 1992
July 1992 events in Europe